Pont Aberarth, also known as the Llanddewi-Aberarth Bridge, is a single-arched grade II listed bridge, which spans the River Arth in the village of Aberarth, Ceredigion, Wales. It was completed in 1849, and carries the A487 trunk road between Cardigan and Aberystwyth.

History
An earlier bridge at Aberarth was destroyed by floods in 1846. Calls for tenders to rebuild the bridge were made early in 1847. Along with plans, costs and sureties, the successful tender would have to include maintaining the bridge for seven years.

Construction
The new bridge was completed in 1849 by Thomas Penson of Oswestry or his son Richard Penson. The bridge carries the A487 road, also known as the Fishguard to Bangor Trunk Road in West and North Wales. A short section with an arch for leat overflow carries the date 1912. The bridge was listed Grade II on 23 May 1996, and it is described as "Pont Aberarth and attached abutment walls".

See also
 List of bridges in Wales

References

External links
 

Stone bridges in the United Kingdom
Bridges completed in 1849
Bridges in Ceredigion
Grade II listed bridges in Wales
Road bridges in Wales